Rímac is a district in the Lima Province, Peru. It lies directly to the north of downtown Lima, to which it is connected by six bridges over the Rímac River. The district also borders the Independencia, San Martín de Porres, and San Juan de Lurigancho districts. Vestiges of Lima's colonial heyday remain today in an area of the Rímac district known as the Historic centre of Lima, which was declared a UNESCO World Heritage Site in 1988.
Downtown Rímac District has, like its southern counterpart, its eastern and western sides divided by Jirón Trujillo, which connects to Lima District's Jirón de la Unión through the Puente de Piedra, the oldest bridge in the whole city. Rímac's East side features the Plaza de Acho, the most famous bullfighting arena in South America and one of the most well known in the world.

Looking directly from Puente Ricardo Palma on downtown Lima district's East side can be seen a large building with the logo of Cristal beer, one of two famous Peruvian brands. This was the main brewery until the Backus company moved operations to Ate in the 1990s.

North of the plant goes the Alameda de los Descalzos, a short boulevard with a large planted median leading into the Convento de los Descalzos (Discalced Monks convent). Built in the 18th century by the Spanish colonial government, it is one of the best features in this lower-middle-class district.

Northern Rímac, or Amancaes, once romanticized in ballads as "La Flor de Amancaes", a hilly prairie, is now overrun with pueblos jóvenes (shanty towns). The Cerro San Cristóbal, which is the highest point in the Lima Province, is located in the district.

Boundaries 
 North: Independencia
 East: San Juan de Lurigancho
 South: Downtown Lima
 West: San Martín de Porres

Urban areas 
As of 1993, Rímac is divided into the following urban areas:
 Caqueta
 Alameda de los Descalzos
 Cerro Palomares
 Ciudad y Campo
 El Bosque
 El Manzano
 Huascarán
 Huerta Guinea
 La Florida
 La Huerta
 Las Totoritas
 Leoncio Prado
 Perricholi
 Rímac
 Santa Candelaria
 Santa Rosa
 Ventura Rossi
 Villacampa

Festivities 
 Señor Crucificado del Rímac

See also 
 Administrative divisions of Peru

References

External links

  www.munirimac.gob.pe Official website
 1.40 Gigapixel Image of Lima

Districts of Lima